The Russo-Kazan Wars was a series of wars fought between the Grand Duchy of Moscow and the Khanate of Kazan from 1439, until Kazan was finally conquered by the Tsardom of Russia under Ivan the Terrible in 1552.

General

Before it separated from the Golden Horde, the Kazan region was part of Volga Bulgaria (c. 630–1240) and then the Bulgar Ulus of the Golden Horde (c. 1240–1438). They adopted Islam in 921, 67 years before Russia became Christian. The boundary between Muscovy and Kazan was near Nizhny Novgorod, about half way between the two cities. The land east of Nizhny Novgorod was fairly difficult. When the Tatars attacked they would first hit Nizhny Novgorod and then move on Murom, Ryazan, and other places, only twice approaching Moscow. When the Russians attacked they would usually send two armies, one down the Volga and one over land. As Muscovy grew stronger, fighting shifted eastward. Before 1552 the Russians made no attempt to conquer Kazan and contented themselves with maintaining a pro-Russian khan. A pro-Russian khan meant peace and an anti-Russian khan meant independence and war. Kazan never established a stable dynasty. Pro-Russian khans often came from the Qasim Khanate while anti-Russian khans were brought in from Crimea and other khanates. There were usually pro- and anti-Russian factions, but they seem to have been temporary and unstable.

Wars of Vasily II
In 1439, a year after the khanate's foundation, the very first khan of Kazan, Ulugh Muhammad, advanced on Moscow with a large army. Vasily II of Moscow fled from his capital across the Volga River. Tatars devastated the outskirts of Moscow for 10 days and on their way back to Kazan burned Kolomna; they also took many captives.

The campaign of 1445 was disastrous for Muscovy and had major repercussions in Russian politics. Hostilities broke out when Khan Maxmut took the strategic fortress of Nizhny Novgorod and invaded Muscovy. Vasily II mustered an army and defeated the Tatars near Murom and Gorokhovets. Thinking the war over, he disbanded his forces and returned to Moscow in triumph, only to learn that the Tatars had besieged Nizhny Novgorod again.

A new army was mustered and marched towards Suzdal, where they met the Russian generals who had surrendered Nizhny to the enemy after setting the fortress on fire. On 6 June 1445, the Russians and the Tatars clashed in the Battle of Suzdal near the walls of St. Euphemius Monastery. The battle was a resounding success for the Tatars, who took Vasily II prisoner. It took four months and an enormous ransom to recover the monarch from captivity.

Wars of Ivan III

Qasim War (1467–1469)

A fragile peace was broken in 1467, when Ibrahim of Kazan came to the throne and Ivan III of Russia supported the claims of his ally or vassal Qasim Khan. Ivan's army sailed down the Volga, with their eyes fixed on Kazan, but autumn rains and rasputitsa ("quagmire season") hindered the progress of Russian forces. When frosty winter came, the Russian generals launched an invasion of the northern Vyatka Region. The campaign fell apart for lack of unity of purpose and military capability.

The following year, the Russians set out from Kotelnich in the Vyatka Land. They sailed down the Vyatka River and the Kama towards the Volga, pillaging merchant vessels on their way. In response, Ibrahim mounted a counter-offensive, overran Vyatka, and forced local inhabitants into slavery for the duration of the campaign.

In 1469, a much stronger army was raised and, sailing down the Volga and the Oka, linked up in Nizhny Novgorod. The Russians marched downstream and ravaged the neighbourhood of Kazan but did not dare to lay siege to the Tatar capital because Qasim's widow had pledged to negotiate an advantageous peace with Ibrahim (her son). In the meantime, the units from Yaroslavl and Veliky Ustyug vainly attempted to win Vyatka to the Russian side. After negotiations were broken, the Tatars clashed with the Russians in two bloody but indecisive battles.

In autumn 1469 Ivan III launched a third invasion of the khanate. The Russian commander, Prince Daniil Kholmsky, besieged Kazan, cut off water supplies, and compelled Ibrahim to surrender. Under the terms of the peace settlement, the Tatars set free all the ethnic Christian Russians they had enslaved in the forty previous years.

Siege of Kazan (1487)
The Vyatka Region remained the principal bone of contention between Kazan and Moscow for decades to come. In 1478, shortly before his death, Ibrahim devastated the region. In revenge, Ivan III sent his generals to sack the neighbourhood of Kazan. At that time Ibrahim died and was succeeded by Ilham, whilst his half-brother Moxammat Amin fled to Moscow. Ivan III allowed him to settle in Kashira and pledged his support for Moxammat's claims to the Tatar throne.

In 1484 Russia placed Moxammat Amin on the throne, but within a year Ilham regained power. In 1487 Ivan again found it prudent to intervene in Kazan affairs and replace Ilham with Moxammat Amin. Prince Kholmsky sailed down the Volga from Nizhny Novgorod and laid siege to Kazan on 18 May. The city fell to the Russians on 9 June. Ilham was sent in chains to Moscow before being imprisoned in Vologda, while Moxammat Amin was proclaimed the new khan. In reference to this victorious campaign, Ivan III proclaimed himself "Lord of Volga Bulgaria".

Battles of Arsk Field (1506)
The last war of Ivan's reign was instigated by Ilham's widow, who married Moxammat Amin and persuaded him to assert his independence from Moscow in 1505. The rebellion broke out into the open on Saint John's Day, when the Tatars massacred Russian merchants and envoys present at the annual Kazan Fair. A huge army of the Kazan and Nogai Tatars then advanced towards Nizhny Novgorod and besieged the city. The affair was decided by 300 Lithuanian archers, who had been captured by Russians in the Battle of Vedrosha and lived in Nizhny in captivity. They managed to put the Tatar vanguard into disarray: the khan's brother-in-law was killed in action and the horde retreated.

Ivan's death prevented hostilities from being renewed until May 1506, when Prince Fyodor Belsky led Russian forces against Kazan. After the Tatar cavalry attacked his rear, many Russians took flight or drowned in the Foul Lake (22 May). Prince Vasily Kholmsky was sent to relieve Belsky and defeated the khan on Arsk Field on June 22. Moxammat Amin withdrew to the Arsk Tower but, when the Russians started to celebrate their victory, ventured out and inflicted an excruciating defeat on them (June 25). Although it was the most brilliant Tatar victory in decades, Moxammat Amin – for some reason not clearly understood – resolved to sue for peace and paid homage to Ivan's successor, Vasily III of Russia.

Wars of Vasily III
A new massacre of Russian merchants and envoys residing in Kazan took place in 1521. Vasily III was so enraged that he forbade his subjects to visit the Kazan Fair again. Instead, the famous Makariev Fair was inaugurated downstream from Nizhny Novgorod, an establishment which undermined the economical prosperity of Kazan, thus contributing to its eventual downfall.

In 1524, Prince Ivan Belsky led the 150,000-strong Russian army against the Tatar capital. This campaign is described in detail by a foreign witness, Herberstein. Belsky's huge army spent 20 days encamped on an island opposite Kazan, awaiting the arrival of Russian cavalrymen. Then news came that part of the cavalry had been defeated, and the vessels loaded with provisions had been captured by the Tatars. Although the army suffered from hunger, Belsky at once laid siege to the city and soon the Tatars sent their envoys proposing terms. Belsky accepted them and speedily returned to Moscow.

Prince Belsky returned to the walls of Kazan in July 1530. The khan had fortified his capital and built a new wall, yet the Russians set the city ablaze, massacring their rivals utterly (according to Russian chronicles) and causing their enemy, Safa Giray, to withdraw to Arsk. The Tatars sued for peace, promising to accept any khan appointed from Moscow. The tsar put Shahgali's younger brother, Canghali, on the throne. He was murdered by the anti-Russian faction in 1535.

Russian chronicles record about forty attacks of Kazan khans on the Russian territories (mainly the regions of Nizhniy Novgorod, Murom, Vyatka, Vladimir, Kostroma, Galich) in the first half of the 16th century. Half of Kazan raids occurred in the 1530s and 1540s. Besides 1521, most ruinous Kazan attacks occurred in 1522, 1533, 1537, 1538, 1539, 1540, and 1541.

Wars of Ivan IV

While Ivan IV was a minor, border skirmishes continued unabated, but the leaders of both powers were reluctant to commit their troops to open conflicts. In 1536, the Russians and Tatars were on the brink of a new war and met near Lyskovo, but the battle was averted. Over the following years, the Crimean khan constructed an offensive alliance with Safa Giray of Kazan, his relative. When Safa Giray invaded Muscovy in December 1540, the Russians used Qasim Tatars to contain him. After his advance was stalled near Murom, Safa Giray was forced to withdraw towards his own borders.

These reverses undermined Safa Giray's authority in Kazan. A pro-Russian party, represented by Shahgali, gained enough popular support to usurp the throne more than once. In 1545, Ivan IV mounted an expedition to the Volga River, mainly in order to flex muscles and to show his support for pro-Russian factions. Little was achieved during the campaign of 1547-48 and the story was much the same for 1549-50.

In 1551, detailed schemes for the eventual conquest of Kazan started to be aired. The tsar sent his envoy to the Nogai Horde and they promised to maintain neutrality during the impending war. The Ar begs and Udmurts submitted to Russian authority as well. In 1551, the wooden fort of Sviyazhsk was transported down the Volga from Uglich all the way to Kazan. It was used as the Russian place d'armes during the decisive campaign of 1552.

Fall of Kazan (1552)

On 16 June 1552 Ivan IV led a 150,000-strong Russian army from Moscow towards Kolomna. They routed the Crimean Tatars under Devlet Giray near Tula before turning to the east. The tsar pressed on towards Kazan, and the final siege of the Tatar capital commenced on 30 August. Under the supervision of Prince Alexander Gorbatyi-Shuisky, the Russians used ram weapons, a battery-tower, mines, and 150 cannons. The Russians had the advantage of efficient military engineers, such as Ivan Vyrodkov, Nemchin Erazm ("Rozmysl")
from the Grand Duchy of Lithuania, and the English engineer Butler.
The besiegers blocked the city's water supply and breached the walls before the final storming on 2 October led to the taking of the city of Kazan, and the razing of its fortifications.

The fall of Kazan had as its primary effect the assertion of Moscow's control over the Middle Volga. The Bashkirs accepted Ivan IV's authority two years later. The tsar celebrated his victory over Kazan by building several churches with oriental features, most famously Saint Basil's Cathedral on Red Square in Moscow. The siege of Kazan forms the subject of the longest poem in the Russian language, Mikhail Kheraskov's epic Rossiada (1771–1779).

After the fall of Kazan a guerrilla uprising known as the Kazan War started in the region, lasting several years until its final suppression in 1556. The Tsar responded with a policy of Christianization and Russification of his Tatar subjects and other indigenous peoples, an approach not reversed until the time of Catherine the Great (reigned 1762–1796).

See also 
List of Mongol and Tatar raids against Rus'

Notes

References

Further reading
Трофимов В. Поход на Казань, ее осада и взятие в 1552 г. Kazan, 1890.
Коротов И.А. Иван Грозный. Военная деятельность. Moscow, 1952.
Казанская история. Moscow-Leningrad, 1954.

 
Wars involving Russia
Khanate of Kazan
15th-century conflicts
16th-century conflicts
15th century in the Grand Duchy of Moscow
16th century in the Grand Duchy of Moscow
1438 in Europe
1552 in Russia
Russia Kazan
15th-century military history of Russia
16th-century military history of Russia